Marjan Keršič aka Belač (18 May 1920 – 3 June 2003) was a Slovenian sculptor and mountaineer.

Sculpture
Keršič was a student of Boris Kalin. He graduated in 1949 at the Ljubljana Academy of Arts. From 1962 to 1966 he taught sculpture at the School of Visual Design in Ljubljana. His first works can be classified as typical of Social Realism (a monument to the Slovene National Liberation Struggle in Planina pri Rakeku, 1953). Later he continued in a moderate Realism (Aleš Bebler Monument in Nova Gorica, 1981).

Mountaineering
In August 1960, Keršič was part of the  expedition, the first Yugoslav mountaineering expedition to the Himalayas. They ascended Trisul III.

External links
 Marjan Keršič Belač, kipar in alpinist (Marjan Keršič aka Belač), the sculptor and the mountain climber. TV documentary. RTV Slovenija. 

1920 births
2003 deaths
20th-century Slovenian sculptors
20th-century Slovenian male artists
Yugoslav mountain climbers
University of Ljubljana alumni
Yugoslav sculptors